Ester Geislerová (born 5 March 1984) is a Czech actress and former model.

Biography
Geislerová was born in Prague. She studied at the Academy of Fine Arts. Her first film was F. A. Brabec's 1996 film . She is the youngest of three sisters, including actress Anna Geislerová. Geislerová won the national Elite Model Look in 2002. Although she has acted on film and television, she has not acted on stage. In 2005, she gave birth to twins, daughter Mia Rosa and son Jan Etiènne.

Selected filmography 
 (1996)
Most (2003)
Snowboarďáci (2004)
Up and Down (2004)
The House (2011)
Dogs Don't Wear Pants (2019)
LOVEhunt (2019)

References

External links

1984 births
Living people
Czech film actresses
Czech television actresses
Czech female models
Actresses from Prague
20th-century Czech actresses
21st-century Czech actresses
Models from Prague
Academy of Fine Arts, Prague alumni